Norris Mountain may refer to:

Norris Mountain (Alaska)
Norris Mountain (Montana)
Mt. Norris (Vermont)